Serrat is a surname. Notable people with the surname include:

Joan Manuel Serrat (born 1943), Spanish singer-songwriter
Fabienne Serrat (born 1956), French alpine ski racer
Sara Serrat (born 1995), Spanish footballer
Julian Serrat, fictional character on the NBC series Last Resort

Catalan-language surnames